The Senior High School Entrance Examination, or commonly known as Zhongkao (Chinese: 中考), is the academic examination held annually in the mainland of the People's Republic of China to distinguish junior high school graduates. This examination is a prerequisite for entrance into almost all education institutions at the senior high school level, such as common senior high schools(普通高中), secondary skill schools(中专), vocational high schools, and technical high schools. It is usually taken by students in their last year of junior high school.
However, it is mostly organised at a provincial level, which gives rise to a great variety of content and difficulty.

Before the Senior High School Entrance Examination, many provinces will hold two simulation exams (called the first/second preliminary exam, or 一模/二模), and some provinces mandate three practice examinations. The Senior High School Entrance Examination problems are  usually made by province, but few provinces delegate the power of creating problems to cities. This exam is the second examination system recovered after the Cultural Revolution. It takes place in early June every year, however in few place it takes place in late June or even early July.

In 1980, the decades when the exams were recovered, the Graduation Examination of Junior High School and the Senior High School Entrance Examination were the same exam. If the students failed the Senior High School Entrance Examination, then they could not graduate from the junior high school, even if there was a senior high school that would admit them. These students were refused by all senior high schools because of "failure in graduation from junior high school" (初中肄业), which is what is commonly called “sending back the document” (退档). However some places had a system to makeup the Senior High School Entrance Examination. Since mid-1990s, the Graduation Examination of Junior High School has become separated from the Senior High School Entrance Examination, but some provinces and cities (such as Shanghai) the two exams are still combined.

References

External links
Website of the Senior High School Entrance Examination
Chongqing Educational and Science Institution
 Sina，Zhongkao
The Examination Centre of the Ministry of Education in China
the Ministry of Education in China
Beijing Senior High School Entrance Examination in 2007
Official website of educational examination in Beijing
Official website of educational examination in Hunan
Official website of educational examination in Hebei
Official website of educational examination in Shanghai
Official website of educational examination in Zhejiang
Admission examination website in Shenzhen

Academic pressure in East Asian culture
Secondary education in China